ISO 5426 ("Extension of the Latin alphabet coded character set for bibliographic information interchange") is a character set developed by ISO, similar to ISO/IEC 6937. It was first published in 1983.

Character set

ISO 5426-2 
ISO 5426-2 ("Latin characters used in minor European languages and obsolete typography") is a second part to ISO 5426, published in 1996. It specifies a set of 70 characters, some of which do not exist in Unicode. Michael Everson proposed the missing characters in Unicode 3.0, but some were postponed for further study. Later, new evidence was found, and more was encoded. P with belt is probably an error for P with flourish.

� Not in Unicode

References 

Character sets
5426